Television in Singapore began on 15 February 1963. The public broadcaster, MediaCorp TV, has a monopoly on terrestrial television channels and is fully owned by government holding company Temasek Holdings. Local pay TV operators are StarHub TV and Singtel TV. The private ownership of satellite dishes was previously forbidden.

Singapore households also have a high rate of TV penetration.

History

Television Singapura/Radio and Television Singapore (1963-1980)
At 6pm on Friday, 15 February 1963, a pilot television broadcasting service began in Singapore with a broadcast that lasted 1 hour and 40 minutes. After the image of the state flag and the playing of the national anthem, Majulah Singapura, then-Minister for Culture S. Rajaratnam became the first person to appear on Singapore TV, announcing that "Tonight might well mark the start of a social and cultural revolution in our lives." Following his speech, the first programme televised in Singapore was a 15-minute documentary produced by Television Singapura called TV Looks at Singapore. It was followed by two cartoons, a news report and newsreel, a comedy show and a local variety show.

At the time, it was estimated that only one in 58 persons in Singapore owned a TV set, and the pilot service offered only one hour of broadcasting per day on Channel 5. On 2 April 1963, President Yusof Ishak officially inaugurated the regular service of Television Singapura. It started off broadcasting from 7.15 pm to 11.15 pm every day, showing programmes in Singapore's four official languages (English, Mandarin [including other Chinese dialects], Malay and Tamil). On 23 November 1963, a second channel, Channel 8 was inaugurated. It took over Chinese and Tamil programming, while English and Malay programming remained on Channel 5. Commercial advertising was allowed on Channel 5 starting 15 January 1964. Both channels aired during the brief time Singapore was a state of Malaysia from that year to 9 August 1965, airing together with today's Radio Televisyen Malaysia (TV Malaysia at that time) then from the Klang Valley and Kuala Lumpur areas. From that day of independence when then-Prime Minister Lee Kuan Yew addressed Singaporeans on the inevitable independence, both channels became the national TV stations and later formed the TV Division of Radio Television Singapore (RTS).
                                                                                                                                              
From 31 January 1967, Channel 8 also became home to the Educational Television Service, which showed TV programmes produced by the Ministry of Education on school subjects at different educational levels and in different languages, in which they later transferred them to Channel 12 in 1993.

On 7 July 1974, colour TV made its debut in Singapore when the live-broadcast of the finals of the 1974 FIFA World Cup (between West Germany and The Netherlands), narrated by Brian Richmond, was displayed in colour. About 2,000 colour TV sets were sold in Singapore three days before the match. Almost a month later, the Singapore National Day Parade (held at Padang) was broadcast in colour for the first time in all four languages.

From 1 July 1978, in line with the introduction of the Singapore government's Speak Mandarin Campaign, skits and advertisements on TV no longer used Chinese dialects. In November, the Hong Kong drama Heaven Sword and Dragon Sabre (倚天屠龙记 or Yee Tin To Long Kei) became the first programme in Chinese dialect to be dubbed in Mandarin before its Singaporean broadcast.

Singapore Broadcasting Corporation (1980–1994)
With effect from 1 February 1980, Radio and Television Singapore, which was under the Ministry of Culture (now known as Ministry of Culture, Community and Youth), was partially privatised by an Act of Parliament and was relaunched as Singapore Broadcasting Corporation (SBC), with a new corporate log while retaining a virtual monopoly on television programming in Singapore. In 1983, it introduced SBCText, a teletext service providing regularly updated information on the news, weather, travel, sports, shopping, leisure and entertainment. In 1984, a third free-to-air TV channel, Channel 12, which would focus on serious, "heavy" cultural and educational programming, was introduced.

After almost four years since the start of the Speak Mandarin Program, in-lieu of the campaign, SBC 8 produced its first-ever full-length local Mandarin drama titled Seletar Robbery on 25 July 1982, which would become one of the pioneer Chinese dramas to be produced and aired in the channel (past productions had been miniseries and dramas imported from Hong Kong which were redubbed in Mandarin). In 1984, The Awakening was produced in commemoration of the Silver Jubilee of self-governance status in Singapore. By 1994, Channel 5 would follow suit with its first English-language drama.

On 27 February 1988, SBC held its first Star Search competition to bring new faces into the broadcast entertainment industry. Zoe Tay won the first competition and went on to become one of the biggest television celebrities in Singapore. On 26 February 1994, SBC held the first Star Awards ceremony (红星大奖) to recognise Singapore's television talents. In that first year, the only awards given out were ten Most Popular Male and Female Artistes awards and the Most Popular Newcomer award; it has been held in December for the first 13 ceremonies before changing its date to April from the 2009 ceremony onwards.

By 1990 (the Silver Jubilee of Singapore's Independence), all SBC channels began to air in stereo sound, in time for the closing activities of the jubilee commemorations nationwide.

Television Corporation of Singapore (1994–2001)
On 1 October 1994, the SBC was privatised, and Singapore International Media group was divided into three separate companies, which include Television Corporation of Singapore (TCS), Radio Corporation of Singapore (RCS) and Singapore Television Twelve (STV12). In September 1995, 24-hour transmission for English and Mandarin programmes were launched for Channels 5 and 8 respectively, while Channel 12 was rebranded to Prime 12 (specialized for Malay, Tamil and Foreign-language programming) and Premiere 12 (specialized for arts, children's and sports programming).

On 1 March 1999, Channel NewsAsia was launched as Singapore's first dedicated news channel. Initially regional, but later went international since 2000. In June 1999, TCS underwent a corporate restructuring and became Media Corporation of Singapore (commonly known as MediaCorp).

On 30 January 2000, Prime 12 and Premiere 12 were respectively replaced by Suria (which means "sun" or "sunlight" in Malay, specialized for Malay programmes), and Central—whose schedule was divided into three strands known as Kids Central (children's programmes), Vasantham Central (Tamil programmes) and Arts Central.

Competition and merger 
On 12 February 2001, the Television Corporation of Singapore, Radio Corporation of Singapore and Singapore Television Twelve were renamed to Mediacorp TV, Mediacorp Radio, Mediacorp TV12 respectively as part of a new management plan following their dissolution.

In May 2001, the Singapore government granted new free-to-air licenses to SPH MediaWorks, a subsidiary of publisher Singapore Press Holdings. The company launched two channels, TVWorks (later renamed  Channel i) and Channel U, with English and Chinese programming respectively. In late-2004, citing financial issues and a small market for English-language programmes, SPH sold the channels to Mediacorp, resulting in Channel i shutting down at the end of the year, and Channel U continuing as a complement to Channel 8.

On 19 October 2008, Central was split into two standalone channels, the Tamil-language Vasantham, and Okto, a new channel containing a mixture of children's and arts programmes. In June 2014, Okto also began to carry sports coverage as well.

On 1 May 2019, Okto was replaced by a branded daytime block on Channel 5 under the Okto branding.

Cable and fiber-optic television 
In 1992, Singapore's first pay TV company, Singapore Cable Vision (SCV), began offering news and entertainment channels, while progressively rolling out the construction of its cable TV network across Singapore. The network was completed in 1999. SCV had about 1,500 subscribers in 1992 and became a standard practice for StarHub users. StarHub also have different package for their fibre internet service. On 1 October 2002, Singapore Cable Vision merged with Singapore telecommunications company StarHub to create StarHub Cable Vision, a pay TV service with more than 40 international channels of news, movies, entertainment, sports, music and education. The service has been known as StarHub TV since 2007.

On 20 July 2007, telecommunications provider SingTel began offering a digital pay TV service, Singtel TV, through its broadband network. The Internet Protocol television (IPTV) had 26 channels, including on-demand channels.

In November 2019, StarHub completed the transition of its subscribers to a new fiberoptic network and IPTV-based television service, which offered increased capacity for high-definition channels, and other new features.

Internet television 
In 2006, MOBTV (MediaCorp Online Broadband Television) was launched as Mediacorp's first subscription-based video on demand service that provides viewers with access to various TV programmes via immediate digital streaming or download from an Internet connection. MOBTV ceased its operation in on 30 March 2010 while its services was merged to another website, xinmsn, a joint-venture between MediaCorp and MSN Singapore, which was launched earlier that month, while the rest was rebranded to SingTel mio TV under MobTV Select in 2012 until 7 January 2014 (the MobTV Select were pulled from SingTel TV on 8 October as well). However, other applications, such as StarHub GO, SingTel TV GO, and Dash, were also launched in-lieu of the closure.

In 2013, Mediacorp launched another internet TV service, Toggle, later rebranded as meWATCH in 2020.

Other international catch-up or on-demand are available in Singapore. These such as Netflix, Amazon Prime Video, Apple TV+, WeTV, Catchplay+, Viu, iQIYI, Mola, Hotstar, Disney+ and HBO Go.

Digital terrestrial television 
In June 2012, after a trial conducted by Mediacorp and StarHub in Ang Mo Kio and Bedok, the Media Development Authority officially announced that Singapore would adopt the European DVB-T2 standards for digital terrestrial television, with Mediacorp aiming to make all seven of its free-to-air channels available in digital by the end of 2013, and Channel 5, Channel 8, Suria, and Vasantham also expected to launch HD services by then as well. The member countries of the Association of Southeast Asian Nations (ASEAN) agreed to complete their transitions by 2020.

The MDA instituted a labelling program to promote televisions and converter boxes compatible with digital television, and began the Digital TV Assistance Scheme (DTVAS) in 2014, allowing qualifying low-income households to receive a free converter box. In January 2016, Minister for Communications and Information Yaacob Ibrahim stated a goal for an analogue shutdown by the end of 2017, in order to open up the spectrum for mobile broadband and the Smart Nation initiative.

On 6 November 2017, in response to a question posed in Parliament by Melvin Yong, showing concerns for the availability of Mediacorp programming, Ibrahim announced that the MDA would postpone the analogue shutdown to 31 December 2018. It was reported that only around half of low-income households in Singapore had participated in the DTVAS. Beginning the same day, analogue signals of Mediacorp channels began to display a text "Analogue" indicator next to their logo bugs. Beginning 17 September 2018, the analogue signals also began to display a "squeeze-back" L-bar, displaying reminders and information regarding the transition. Mediacorp personalities such as Romeo Tan, Xiang Yun, and He Ying Ying made appearances at promotional events to promote the transition.

Analogue television services ended shortly after midnight on 2 January 2019.

Free-to-air terrestrial television channels

Mediacorp

Defunct channels
Sportscity/City TV
Channel i
Central
Kids Central
Vasantham Central
Arts Central
MediaCorp TVMobile 
Okto

Internet TV
meWATCH (launched in 2013 as Toggle)

Defunct Internet TV
MOBTV (launched in 2007, ceased services on 7 January 2014)
xinmsn (launched in March 2010 in collaboration with Microsoft Singapore, ended services on April 1st 2015)

Chat Chat Media
Chat TV (English & Chinese Drama, Short Film, Trailer. It also includes Laughing Avenue)

Channels from neighbouring countries
Due to Singapore's proximity to Malaysia and Indonesia, channels from these countries can also be received over-the-air in Singapore. Both countries have also adopted DVB-T2 as their digital television standards.

Malaysia 
All channels signal are based in Johor Bahru.

Television Channels on myFreeview

Radio Channels on myFreeview

Indonesia 
All channels signal are based in Batam.

Viewers farther away from the Indonesia or Malaysia border usually require specialised equipment to receive the signals.  Catch up TV services available on those channels' websites are now accessible in Singapore but only for local programming.

Television frequencies transmitter

Most-viewed channels 
All viewing shares

Notes

See also
Mass media in Singapore
High-definition television in Singapore
List of Malay-language television channels

References

External links
 Technical and location information